Cavan railway station in Swellan in Cavan Town was a former station on the Inny Junction to Cavan branch of the Midland Great Western Railway, Ireland. The station now houses the offices of The Anglo-Celt Newspaper.

The Clones and Cavan Extension Railway was an extension of the Ulster Railway from Clones in County Monaghan to Cavan opened in 1862.  The station in Cavan was opened firstly by the Midland Great Western Railway with trains to Dublin Broadstone.  However the Ulster Railway also sought to link Cavan with Belfast Great Victoria Street.

References 

 
 Ordnance Survey of Ireland Discovery Series 1:50,000 map no. 34 shows the station locale.

Disused railway stations in County Cavan
Railway stations opened in 1856
Railway stations closed in 1960
1856 establishments in Ireland
Railway stations in the Republic of Ireland opened in the 19th century